Small Town Girl is a 1936 romantic comedy film directed by William A. Wellman and starring Janet Gaynor, Robert Taylor, and James Stewart. The supporting cast features Binnie Barnes, Andy Devine, Lewis Stone and Edgar Kennedy.

Based on a novel by Ben Ames Williams, the film went through many changes before it reached the screen. The script is credited to John Lee Mahin, Edith Fitzgerald, and the husband-and-wife team of Albert Hackett and Frances Goodrich.

Plot 
From TCM.com: “Kay Brannan (Janet Gaynor) is so bored with her life that she can barely tolerate her family and prospective suitor Elmer (James Stewart). A traffic diversion brings hundreds of Yale-Harvard football players through town. One of them, Robert Dakin (Robert Taylor), a socially prominent surgeon from Boston, asks her for directions to a popular roadhouse and takes her there to join in the fun.

Later Bob becomes so drunk that he insists that they have a justice of the peace marry them. Kay is not quite so drunk, but she agrees, eager for any escape from the tedium. The next morning, Bob's parents (Lewis Stone, Nella Walker) like Kay, but are shocked that Bob, who was to marry socialite Priscilla Hyde (Binnie Barnes) in two weeks, would be so foolhardy. To avoid a scandal, Bob suggests to Kay that they pretend to be happily married for six months and then quietly get a divorce. Although hurt, she agrees, and after a staged "honeymoon" aboard the Dakin family yacht, they return to Boston. Gradually, they begin to fall in love, but they still keep each other at arm's length.

When Priscilla returns from a European holiday, she and Bob begin seeing each other secretly. One night, Kay gets a telephone call from Bob's clinic urgently summoning him to perform emergency brain surgery on Jimmy, a young patient. When Priscilla refuses to let her speak to Bob over the phone, Kay goes to Priscilla's apartment to fetch him. Bob starts the operation, but is not sure that he is sober enough to save Jimmy, so he has his colleague Dr. Underwood complete the delicate surgery.

At home, Bob feels like a failure. Kay hesitatingly starts to tell him about her feelings, but Priscilla calls and she leaves. She tells Bob's parents that she is returning home, and a short time later, the local newspaper mentions that Bob is rumored to be leaving for Reno for a divorce. Kay takes a walk and meets Elmer, who proposes, but just then Bob drives up. After telling Kay that he has lost his way to Reno and never wants to find it, they drive off together.”

Cast 
 Janet Gaynor as Katherine Brannan
 Robert Taylor as Dr. Robert Dakin
 Binnie Barnes as Priscilla Hyde
 Andy Devine as George Brannan
 Lewis Stone as Dr. Dakin
 Elizabeth Patterson as Ma Brannan
 Frank Craven as Pa Brannan
 James Stewart as Elmer Clampett
 Isabel Jewell as Emily Brannan
 Charley Grapewin as Dr. Ned Fabre, Robert's boss
 Nella Walker as Mrs. Dakin
 Robert Greig as Childers, the Dakins' butler
 Edgar Kennedy as Captain Mack, in command of the yacht
 Willie Fung as So-So, a family servant

Casting 
TCM’s Margarita Landazuri writes:” MGM had originally announced Small Town Girl as a vehicle for Jean Harlow. Janet Gaynor had been 20th Century Fox's most important star in the late silent and early talkie period. But by 1936, her status at Fox had been eclipsed by... Shirley Temple. So both Gaynor and Fox executives were happy about loaning her to MGM for a first-class production like Small Town Girl, particularly since she would be cast opposite MGM's hottest young leading man.. “

Production 
Landazuri continued: “Director William Wellman was a relative latecomer to the project. Wellman was equally at home in comedies as he was in action films, but his comedy style was more rough-and-tumble than Gaynor's, and the two clashed repeatedly during filming. Wellman was so unhappy, in fact, that he asked to be removed from the picture. MGM denied his request.”

“Later that year, Wellman was working for David O. Selznick in a project dear to Wellman's heart, A Star Is Born. Selznick thought Gaynor would be ideal for the lead, and Wellman, despite his earlier problems with Gaynor, agreed wholeheartedly with Selznick's choice. This collaboration would be much happier for the star and director.”

Box office
According to MGM records, the film earned $1,108,000 in the US and Canada and $497,000 elsewhere resulting in a profit of $274,000.

Accolades
The film was nominated for the American Film Institute's 2002 list AFI's 100 Years...100 Passions.

References

External links 
 
 
 
 

1936 films
1936 romantic comedy films
American romantic comedy films
American black-and-white films
1930s English-language films
Films based on American novels
Films directed by William A. Wellman
Films directed by Robert Z. Leonard
Films scored by Herbert Stothart
Films set in Boston
Metro-Goldwyn-Mayer films
Films scored by Edward Ward (composer)
1930s American films